Sylvère Maes (27 August 1909 – 5 December 1966) was a Belgian cyclist, who is most famous for winning the Tour de France in 1936 and 1939. In 1937, Maes left the 1937 Tour de France together with his Belgian team while he was leading the general classification, in response to actions from French spectators and decisions from the jury.

Biography
Born in 1909 as the youngest in a family of ten children, Maes rode his first cycling race in 1928, and immediately was one of the best young riders. At the end of the 1932 season, Maes became a professional cyclist, and in a short time managed to win two races for professionals.
Maes was a cyclo-cross talent, which he showed by winning the 1933 Critérium International de Cyclo-cross, considered the unofficial cyclo-cross world championship.
In 1933 Maes recorded his first major victory by winning Paris–Roubaix. In the rest of his career, he would focus on the Tour de France.

1934 to 1935 Maes' first Tour de France successes
In 1934, Maes made his debut in the Tour de France as an individual, but had more success than the Belgians in the national team, and was the only Belgian to win a stage. In the general classification, he finished in eighth place.

Maes started the 1935 Tour de France again as an individual. When Joseph Moerenhout left the race in the second stage, the rules allowed an individual to take his place, and Maes was added to the national team. Maes won a mountain stage in the Pyrenées, and finished in fourth place in the general classification.

1936: winning the Tour de France
In 1936, Maes started the Tour de France as a member of the Belgian national team. Maes rode well in the first stages, and when Maurice Archambaud lost time in the seventh stage, Maes became the leader of the race. His closest opponent was Antonin Magne, and they tested each other in the ninth stage. Magne rode away on the Allos, the last climb of the day, and gained three minutes on Maes. Magne then fell because a spectator tried to help him, and Maes was able to come back. Maes gained some time in the next stages, winning two stages run in the team time trial format.
In the 16th stage, Maes escaped early in the stage. Only Yvan Marie and Felicien Vervaecke were initially able to follow him. Marie lost contact, and Vervaecke had mechanical problems during the climb of the Tourmalet, so Maes continued on his own, and gained 15 minutes on Magne. In the rest of the race, his lead was never seriously contested anymore, so Maes won the Tour.

1937: leaving Tour de France in winning position
Maes was the leader of the Belgian team in the 1937 Tour de France. In the ninth stage, Maes took over the lead from Gino Bartali, who was weakened in a fall. When Bartali later left the race, it was clear that the battle would be between Maes and Frenchman Roger Lapébie.
The Tour organisation then decided to reduce the number of team time trials, which mostly harmed Maes's chances, as the Belgians were considered to have the better team. The Belgian team also accused Lapébie of being pulled by a car on the Alps. On the rest day before the Pyrenées, Maes was approached by a person offering him 100.000 Belgian Francs to let Lapébie win the race, which Maes refused.

In the fifteenth stage, where mountains in the Pyrenées were climbed, Maes created a large margin on Lapébie. When Maes punctured, Lapébie was able to reach him, and at the end of the stage only Julián Berrendero was in front of them, and Lapébie won the sprint for the second place. This rewarded Lapébie with 45 seconds bonification time. When the tour directors gave him 90 seconds penalty time for having been pushed, the margin with Maes grew to more than three minutes, but Lapébie had sensed weakness in the Belgian team, and planned to attack in the next stage. The Belgian team complained that the penalty was far too little, because Lapébie's advantage had been much greater. The French team threatened to abandon the race if the penalty was increased, and the Tour directors did not change it.

In the sixteenth stage, Lapébie finished ahead of Maes, cutting the Belgian's lead to only 25 seconds; with only flat stages left, it might be enough for Maes. During that sixteenth stage, Maes had punctured, and had been helped by two Belgian cyclists, Gustaaf Deloor and Adolf Braeckeveldt, who rode as individuals and were not part of the Belgian team. The Tour jury then fined Maes with 15 seconds penalty time in the general classification. During the race, a train crossing had been closed just after Lapébie had passed, and just before Maes was about to pass. Maes was offended by all this, and quit the race, together with the rest of the Belgian team.

In Belgium, the supporters protested against the Tour organisation. Within 24 hours, 20.000 protest letters were sent to a sports magazine, and in ten days more than 100.000 Belgian Francs were sent to the national cycling organisation to support the Tour cyclists.

1938: disappointing Tour de France
Maes was again the team leader in the 1938 Tour de France. Maes was however in bad form, and could not live up to expectations, and Felicien Vervaecke took over the team captain role. Maes finished in 14th place in that tour.
Outside the Tour de France, his cycling year was more successful: he finished in second place in both La Flèche Wallonne and the Tour of Flanders, his best finishings in a one-day classic race outside his 1933 Paris–Roubaix victory.

1939: winning his second Tour de France
In 1939, Maes was again the leader of the Belgian team in the Tour de France, and with the Italian team not starting, he was the major favourite. Another protected racer in the Belgian team was Edward Vissers, but when Vissers escaped in the ninth stage, Maes started to chase his own teammate, and French cyclist René Vietto, leading the general classification, did not have to do much work to defend his lead. In the Alps, Maes was able to beat Vietto. In the time trial in stage 16B, Maes started ten minutes after Vietto, but was able to catch him. His lead was more than 30 minutes, and Vietto could not win anymore. His victory was complete because Maes also won the mountains classification, and his team won the team classification.

1940 to 1947: late career
Maes had his chances to win a third Tour de France interrupted by the Second World War. Most professional races were cancelled, so to find an income, Maes became a bartender.
In 1947, Maes rode the 1947 Giro d'Italia, finishing in fifth place. Maes had planned to start the 1947 Tour de France, and he would have been allowed to wear the yellow jersey during the first stage, as a symbol that the 1947 Tour was the continuation of the 1939 Tour, but he resigned at the last minute. He rode his last season in 1948.

Later life
From 1949 to 1957, Sylvère Maes was the team director of the Belgian team in the Tour de France. After that, he started a pub in Gistel, named 'Au Tourmalet'. Maes died from cancer in 1966, aged 57.

In 2011, a museum opened in Gistel, in honor of Maes and Johan Museeuw.

Career achievements

Major results

1932
Brussels - Luxembourg - Mondorf: winner stage 2
 GP Stad Kortrijk
Den Bosch
 Omloop van het Vlaamse Land
 Jabeke
1933
Critérium International de Cyclo-cross, Cyclo-cross (FRA)
Paris–Roubaix
Schaal Sels-Merksem
 De Panne
1934
Den Bosch
Oudenburg
Tour de France:
8th place overall classification
Winner stage 23
1935
Tour de France:
4th place overall classification
Winner stage 15
1936
Tour de France:
 winner overall classification
Winner stages 13B, 14B, 16, 18B
1937
Tour de France:
Winner stage 5B
1938
Roeselare
1939
Circuit du Morbihan: winner stage 2 and overall classification
Tour de France:
 winner overall classification
Winner Mountains classification
Winner stages 15, 16B
1941
Kessel-lo
1942
 Witte Donderdagprijs
1947
Giro d'Italia:
5th place overall classification

Grand Tour general classification results timeline

References

Further reading

External links

Official Tour de France results for Sylvère Maes

Belgian male cyclists
Tour de France winners
Belgian Tour de France stage winners
1909 births
1966 deaths
Sportspeople from West Flanders
People from Gistel